Jangan Pandang Belakang (translates as "Don't Look Behind") is a 2007 Malaysian Malay-language horror film directed by Ahmad Idham.

Plot 
The movie opens with an unnamed elder being exorcised by an imam during the night. Although the spirit had been exorcised, the man does not make it through the night. The imam orders a bottle be discarded into the sea,

Darma (Pierre Andre) is traumatised by the mysterious death of his fiancee, Rose (Intan Ladyana) who had killed herself. Unknown to him, Rose had been haunted by a malicious spirit which they had brought to her home after picking up a small jar found washed up at the beach. Apparently, the spirit had been imprisoned and was inadvertently released by the couple.

At her home, after her death, before leaving Darma had taken the small jar with him, and with it, the malignant spirit.

Not satisfied with why Rose had suddenly killed herself, Darma decides to investigate the case with the help of Rose's twin sister, Seri, (also played by Intan Ladyana). As they probe into the death, a series of strange occurrences start to unravel, leaving Darma in a disturbed state of mind that affects his life and career. When he is advised to take a week's break from work, he returns to his village to rest. Unknown to him, he is only getting closer to solving his fiancee's death and the truth behind the strange happenings.

It was Darma's senile grandmother who could see the ghost and had unwittingly invited the spirit into the house. In Malay belief, certain spirits cannot enter the house unless invited in. The ghost ends up possessing Darma after tormenting the family, but however the ghost is successfully exorcised by the resident Imam, putting an end to the Saka which had been haunting them.

Cast
 Pierre Andre as Darma
 Intan Ladyana as Rose & Seri
 Khatijah Tan as Mak Lang (Darma's aunt)
 Ruminah Sidek as Opah (Grandmother)
 Rio Elani as Lin
 Hafidzuddin Fazil as Tok Imam

A stuntman Nazari Abu Bakar died during the shooting of the film. The unexpected thing happen when the cameraman try to take a shot at the location, suddenly capture a mystery entity. That photo are being use as a teaser poster of this film.

Reception
The film was released on 5 April 2007 on 51 theatres across Malaysia, Indonesia, Brunei, and Philippines. On its opening weekend, the film debuted at number 1 in Malaysia, grossing $433,589 in 55 theatres with an average $7,883 per theatre. In Philippines, the film debuted at number 9 grossing $19,748 in 20 theatres with an average $987 per theatre. In Singapore, the film grossed $91,030 on its first premiere, ranking at number 2 in 5 theatres with an average $18,206 per theatre. Overall, the film was an international success, grossing RM6.33 million, becoming the highest-grossing film of all time in Malaysia.

Awards and nominations
20th Malaysian Film Festival, 2007 
Won
 Box Office Film

Nominated
 Best Actor - Pierre Andre
 Best Actress in a Supporting Role - Ruminah Sidek
 Best Cinematography - Indra Che Muda Redzuan
 Best Editor - Ahmad Mustadha

References

External links
 Jangan Pandang Belakang at Sinema Malaysia.
 
 Review: Jangan Pandang Belakang

2007 films
2007 horror films
Malaysian horror films
Malay-language films
Films produced by David Teo
Metrowealth Pictures films
Films directed by Ahmad Idham
Films with screenplays by Ahmad Idham
Films with screenplays by Pierre Andre
Malaysian supernatural horror films